

Legislative Assembly elections

Andhra Pradesh

Assam

Bihar

Gujarat

Jammu and Kashmir

Madhya Pradesh

Madras

Maharashtra

Mysore

|- align=center
!style="background-color:#E9E9E9" class="unsortable"|
!style="background-color:#E9E9E9" align=center|Political Party
!style="background-color:#E9E9E9" |Contestants
!style="background-color:#E9E9E9" |Seats won
!style="background-color:#E9E9E9" |Seat change
!style="background-color:#E9E9E9" |Number of votes
!style="background-color:#E9E9E9" |Vote share
!style="background-color:#E9E9E9" |Net change
|-style="background: #90EE90;"
| 
|align="left"|Indian National Congress||208||138|| 12||3,164,811||50.22%|| 1.80
|-
| 
|align="left"|Praja Socialist Party||84||20|| 2||887,363||14.08%|| 0.02
|-
| 
|align="left"|Swatantra Party||59||9||||450,713 ||7.15%||
|-
| 
|align="left"|Maharashtra Ekikaran Samiti||6||6||||136878||2.17%||
|-
| 
|align="left"|Lok Sewak Sangh||17||4||||159,545||2.53%||
|-
| 
|align="left"|Independents||||27|| 9||1,091,011||17.31%||N/A
|-
|
|align="left"|Total||||208||||''''''||||
|-
|}

Punjab

Rajasthan

Uttar Pradesh

West Bengal

References

External links

 Election Commission of India

1962 elections in India
India
1962 in India
Elections in India by year